Yosef Abramowitz is an Israeli-American environmentalist, president and CEO of Energiya Global Capital as well as co-founder of the Arava Power Company.

Biography
Abramowitz was born in 1964 in the United States, to a Jewish family. He lived in Israel as a child from 1969 to 1972, before returning to Boston. While living in Massachusetts, he attended the Solomon Schechter School of Greater Boston, and graduated in 1980 from Hebrew College Prozdor and in 1982 from Brookline High School.  He received a Bachelor of Arts in Jewish Public Policy from Boston University in 1986, where he studied under Elie Wiesel, Howard Zinn and Hillel Levine, and a Master of Arts in Magazine Journalism from Columbia University Graduate School of Journalism in 1991, which he attended on a Wexner Graduate Fellowship. He is married to Rabbi Susan Silverman with whom he had five children. Yosef Abramowitz was President of the Arava Power Company (2006–2013) and then CEO and President of Energiya Global (2011–) founding both companies with partners David Rosenblatt of New Jersey and Ed Hofland of Kibbutz Ketura.

In 2006, he moved from Newton, Massachusetts to Kibbutz Ketura.

Energiya Global Capital
Abramowitz is the president and CEO of an investment platform Energiya Global Capital which finances green energy projects in Sub-Saharan Africa

References 

Living people
1964 births
20th-century American Jews
American emigrants to Israel
Israeli Reform Jews
Israeli activists
Israeli chief executives
Place of birth missing (living people)
Boston University alumni
Businesspeople from Boston
Columbia University Graduate School of Journalism alumni
Bonei Zion Prize recipients
21st-century American Jews